Library of Soul is the third album by South Korean hip-hop duo Leessang. The album was released on October 14, 2005. The album contains 13 songs.

Track listing

2005 albums
Korean-language albums
Leessang albums